Day of the Dead: Bloodline is a 2018 action horror film directed by Hèctor Hernández Vicens, and written by Mark Tonderai and Lars Jacobson, based on characters created by George A. Romero. The film stars Johnathon Schaech, Sophie Skelton, Jeff Gum, Marcus Vanco, Mark Rhino Smith, Cristina Serafini, Lillian Blankenship, Shari Watson, Atanas Srebrev, Ulyana Chan, Nathan Cooper, Vladimir Mihailov, London Grace and Bashar Rahal. It is one of two remakes of Romero's original 1985 film Day of the Dead: the first, also titled Day of the Dead, was released in 2008, while Day of the Dead: Bloodline was released on January 5, 2018.

Plot
Medical student Zoe Parker reluctantly attends a party at her medical school at the behest of her friends. While retrieving a keg of beer from the morgue, Zoe is confronted by her disturbed patient Max, who is obsessively in love with her and whose blood has an unusually high level of antibodies. He attacks and attempts to rape her, but a corpse reanimates and bites into Max’s shoulder. Zoe flees and warns everyone at the party, but hordes of the corpses, later dubbed rotters, burst in and kill all except Zoe, who escapes through a window, only to find the city besieged by rotters.

The survivors of the initial outbreak are sent to refugee camps. Zoe is sent to High Rock Emergency Bunker, run by Lieutenant Miguel Salazar.

Five years later, High Rock Emergency Bunker has lost contact with the other camps and with headquarters. Although Miguel believes a cure is impossible, Zoe and her friend Elyse serve as camp doctors, treating illnesses and using rotter blood samples to create a cure for the rotters.

At Zoe’s urging, Miguel sends Zoe, Elyse, his brother (Zoe's boyfriend) Baca, Frank, Lucy, Derek, and Thomas on a supply run to retrieve medication from Whittendale University for Lily, a little girl suffering bacterial pneumonia. While taking medication from a professor’s office, Zoe encounters Max, now partially a rotter. Horrified, Zoe flees and accidentally attracts the attention of other rotters. The group saves her, but Frank is killed when the rotters overwhelm him. Zoe successfully administers the medicine to Lily; however Max has managed to enter the camp.

Due to Frank’s death, animosity between Zoe and Miguel increases. While walking on her own, Zoe is attacked by Max, but signals for help and is rescued by Miguel, Baca, Thomas, Lucy, and Derek. Realizing that Max is not fully a rotter, Zoe convinces Miguel to allow her to use Max’s blood to create a vaccine, and Miguel gives her 48 hours to create it, having been convinced by Frank’s wife, Elle.

Zoe and Elyse realize they need to test Max’s blood on blood samples from live rotters. She convinces Baca to help her by opening the gates to allow one rotter in and take a blood sample from it. Although this initially goes well, rotters burst through the gates, kill Thomas, and infect Elyse. Miguel kills several rotters and seals the doors to the compound, and, ignoring Zoe’s pleas that she can use the vaccine on her, kills Elyse.

Miguel tells Baca that he saw Zoe's name carved into Max's arm earlier.  When Baca confronts Zoe about this, she tells him about Max’s rape attempt. Max steals the keys to his handcuffs from Alphonse during a scuffle. Max begins to taunt Zoe, telling her repeatedly, “You are mine,” before freeing himself and attempting to rape her again. However, Zoe manages to escape. Lily’s mother, whom Max had previously infected, chases after Lily and kills Derek. Max kills her and chases Lily to the motor pool.

The remaining military personnel arrive, but Max opens the doors and allows a horde of rotters inside, which kill Elle and Lucy among several others. In the ensuing chaos, Lily flees outside, and Zoe chases after her with Max in pursuit. Baca attempts to go after them, but Miguel stops and threatens to shoot him at gunpoint. Both are then bitten by the rotters, and Miguel is ultimately killed while Baca manages to escape.

Max follows them into a greenhouse, where Zoe, hidden in mud, disembowels and decapitates him. Zoe and Lily walk back into the compound, where she finds Baca about to commit suicide to prevent reanimation. Zoe convinces Baca she can cure him with the vaccine and injects him with it, curing him as a result. Sometime later, High Rock Emergency Bunker has been repaired, and Zoe sends a message to any remaining survivors that they have the vaccine, while the rotters’ growls are heard from within a nearby forest.

Cast

Production
On July 10, 2013 it was announced that there would be a second remake of Day of the Dead, titled Day of the Dead: Bloodline. Christa Campbell and Lati Grobman, two of the producers behind Texas Chainsaw 3D, had obtained the rights. Campbell, who had a small role in the first remake said, "We want to keep it as close to the Romero version as possible. To make sure that his fans are happy. These are not going to be zombies climbing walls and doing back flips like in World War Z."

Campbell and Grobman held meetings with possible writers to figure out the best way to adapt the story. It began filming in June 2016.

Release
The film was originally planned to be released in 2017, although it was later announced that the release date had been delayed until January 5, 2018.

Reception
The film was panned by critics and received overwhelmingly negative reviews.

Michael Gingold of Rue Morgue called the idea of a remake "a foolish and pointless exercise" and said the film's themes were "strictly and tediously standard-issue." Brian Tallerico on Rogerebert.com gave the film a star-and-a-half, stating there were a few well-choreographed action scenes, but "I was just watching people I didn’t care about yell at each other and make really stupid decisions." Matt Donato of We Got This Covered gave the film 1.5 stars out of 5 and stated, "Day Of The Dead: Bloodline somehow dethrones 2008's earlier remake attempt as an even more forgettable 'reimagining' (aka rip-off)."

References

External links
 
 

2018 films
2018 horror films
Remakes of American films
American zombie films
Adventure horror films
American monster movies
Living Dead films
Night of the Living Dead (film series)
Apocalyptic films
Films about viral outbreaks
2010s English-language films
2010s monster movies
Films produced by Boaz Davidson
2010s American films
Films set in bunkers